Fernando da Costa Novaes (April 6, 1927 – March 24, 2004) was a Brazilian ornithologist who worked on the Amazonian bird fauna.

Education 
In 1971 he was granted his doctorate from the State University of São Paulo at Rio Claro, with the thesis Estudo ecológico das aves em uma área de vegetação secundária do baixo rio Amazonas, Estado do Pará.

Career 

Novaes was based at the Museu Paraense Emílio Goeldi, in Belém, where he assembled the second largest bird skin and skeleton collection in Brazil. This collection has been renamed in his honor. His major contributions were in defining the Amazon region's faunal boundaries and affinities, as well as clarifying taxonomic problems.

In 1954, Novaes was granted a Simon Guggenheim Memorial Foundation fellowship to study in the US, at the Museum of Vertebrate Zoology, of the University of California at Berkeley, with the renowned ornithologist Alden H. Miller.

Novaes's many publications are listed in the obituaries by Oren and Silva.

He is commemorated in the name of the Alagoas foliage-gleaner, Philydor novaesi.

Selected publications 
 Acta Amazonica
 1976: "As aves do rio Aripuanã, Estado de Mato Grosso e Amazonas," 6(4): 61-85.
 1981: "Área de Vertebrados do Museu Paraense Emílio Goeldi," 11(1): 183-188.
 Anais da Academia Brasileira de Ciencias
 1952: With J.M. Carvalho. "A new species of Megninia from the roseate spoonbill (Analgesidae, Analgesinae)," (1): 1-12.
 1961: "Sobre Thamnophilus palliatus (Licht.), com especial referência ao leste do Brasil. (Formicariidae, Aves)," 33(1): 111-117.
 Anais da Sociedade Sul-Riograndense de Ornitologia
 1980: "Observações sobre Procnias alba (Hermann), Araponga-branca," 1: 4-6.
 1981: "Sobre algumas aves do litoral do Estado do Pará," 2: 5-8.
 1982: "Observações sobre o comportamento de Thamnophilus amazonicus Sclater (Passeriformes, Formicariidae)," 3: 1-5.
 Ararajuba
 1991: With M.F.C. Lima. "Variação geográfica e anotações sobre morfologia e biologia de Selenidera gouldii (Piciformes: Ramphastidae)," 2: 59-63.
 Arquivos de Zoologia
 1960: "Sobre uma coleção de Aves do Sudeste do Estado do Pará," 11(6): 133-146.
 The Auk
 1959: "Quiscalus lugubris in Brasil," 76(2): 242.
 Biological Conservation
 1986: With D.C. Oren. "Observations on the Golden Parakeet Aratinga guarouba in Northern Brazil," 36: 329-337.
 Boletim do Museu Nacional Zoologia
 1952: "Algumas adendas à ornitologia de Goiás, Brasil," (117): 1-7.
 Boletim do Museu Paraense Emílio Goeldi
 1957: "Notas sobre a ecologia do bacurau Hydropsalis climaco¬cerca Tschudi (Caprimulgidae, Aves). Notas de ornitologia amazônica 1. Gêneros Formicarius e Phlegopsis," (8): 1-9.
 1957: With J.M. Carvalho. "Observações sobre a nidificação de Glaucis hirsuta (Gmelin) (Trochilidae, Aves)," (1): 1-12.
 1957: "Contribuição à ornitologia do noroeste do Acre," (9): 1-30.
 1958: "As aves e as comunidades bióticas no alto rio Juruá, Território do Acre," (14): 1-13.
 1959: "Variação geográfica e o problema da espécie nas aves do grupo Ramphocelus carbo," (22): 1-63.
 1963: "Uma nova subespécie de Turdus ignobilis Sclater no Estado do Pará e sobre a ocorrência de Turdus amaurochalinus Cabanis na região de Belém," (40): 1-4.
 1964: "Uma nova raça geográfica de Piprites chloris (Temminck) do Estado do Pará (Pipridae, Aves)," (47): 1-5.
 1965: "Notas sobre algumas aves da Serra Parima, Território de Roraima (Brasil)," (54): 1-10.
 1967: "Sobre algumas aves pouco conhecidas na Amazônia brasileira," (64): 1-8.
 1969: "Análise ecológica de uma avifauna da região do rio Acará, Estado do Pará," (69): 1-52.
 1970: "Distribuição ecológica e abundância das aves em um trecho da mata do baixo rio Guamá (Estado do Pará)," (71): 1-54.
 1978: "Sobre algumas aves pouco conhecidas da Amazônia brasileira II," (90): 1-15.
 1980: "Observações sobre a avifauna do alto curso do rio Paru de Leste, Estado do Pará," (100): 1-58.
 1981: "A estrutura da espécie nos periquitos do gênero Pionites Heine (Psittacidae, Aves)," (106): 1-21.
 Bulletin of the British Ornithologists' Club
 1985: With D.C. Oren. "A new subspecies of White Bellbird Procnias alba (Hermann) Southeastern Amazonia," 105(1): 23-25.
 1991: "A new subspecies of Grey-cheeked Nunlet Nonnula ruficapilla from Brazilian Amazonia," 111(4): 187-188.
 The Condor
 1959: "Procellaria aequinoctialis on Amazon River in Brazil," 61(4): 299.
 1984: With P. Roth and D.C. Oren. "The White Bellbird (Procnias alba) in the Serra dos Carajás, Southeastern Para, Brazil," 26: 343-344.
 Goeldiana zoologia
 1992: "Bird observations in the State of Piauí, Brazil," 17: 1-5.
 Papéis Avulsos de Zoologia
 1961: "Sobre as raças geográficas de Philydor rufus (Vieillot) no Brasil (Furnariidae, Aves)," 14(24): 227-235.
 Publicações Avulsas do Museu Paraense Emílio Goeldi
 1973: With T. Pimentel. "Observações sobre a avifauna dos Campos de Bragança, Estado do Pará," 20: 229-246.
 1973: "Aves de uma vegetação secundária na foz do Amazonas," 21: 1-88.
 1974: "Ornitologia do Território do Amapá I," 25: 1-121.
 1978: "Ornitologia do Território do Amapá II," 29: 1-75.
 Revista Brasileira de Biologia
 1949: "Variação nos tucanos brasileiros do gênero Ramphastos L. (Ramphastidae, Piciformes)," 9(3): 285-296.
 1950: "Sobre as aves de Sernambetiba," 10(2): 199-208.
 1952: "Resultados ornitológicos da "Expedição João Alberto" à ilha da Trindade," 12(2): 219-228.
 1952: With J.M. Carvalho. "A new genus and species of feather mite (Pterolichinae, Analgesidae)," 24(3): 303-306.
 1953: "Sobre a validade de Syndactyla mirandae (Snethlage, 1928) (Furnariidae, Aves)," 14(1): 75-76.
 1953: "A new species of Neumanniella from the tataupa tinamou (Sarcoptiformes, Analgesidae)," 13(2): 203-204.
 1953: "A new race of tody-tyrant from southeastern Brasil (Tyrannidae, Aves)," 13(3): 235-236.
 1960: "Sobre Ramphotrigon megacephala (Swainson) (Tyrannidae, Aves)," 20(2): 217-221.
 1960: "As raças geográficas de Thamnophilus doliatus (Linnaeus) no Brasil. (Formicariidae, Aves)," 20(4): 415-424.
 1961: "Distribuição e diferenciação geográfica de Automolus leucopthalmus (Wied.) e Automolus infuscatus (Sclater) (Furnariidae, Aves)," 21(2): 179-192.
 1968: "Variação geográfica em Platyrinchus saturatus Salvin & Godman (Aves, Tyrannidae)," 28(2): 115-119.
 Revista Brasileira de Zoologia
 1991: With M.F.C. Lima. "As aves do rio Peixoto de Azevedo, Mato Grosso, Brasil," 7(3): 351-381.
 Revista Científica
 1950: "Sobre alguns termos da sistemática zoológica," 1(4): 10-14.
 Summa Brasiliensis Biologiae
 1947: "Notas sobre os Conopophagidae do Museu Nacional (Passeriformes, Aves)," 1(13): 243-250.

References 

1927 births
2004 deaths
20th-century Brazilian zoologists
Brazilian ornithologists
São Paulo State University alumni